The name Eadgifu, sometimes Latinized as Ediva or Edgiva, may refer to:

 Eadgifu of Kent (died c. 966), third wife of king Edward the Elder, King of Wessex
 Eadgifu of Wessex (902 – after 955), wife of King Charles the Simple
 Eadgifu, Abbess of Leominster
 Eadgifu the Fair (c. 1025 – c. 1086), a wealthy pre-Conquest landowner, first wife of Harold Godwinson

See also
 Eadgyth, Old English form of the name Edith
 Ealdgyth, Old English form of the name Aldith